Azerbaijan State University of Culture and Arts (ASUCA) was founded in 1923 on the basis of the Baku Theatrical College. It is Azerbaijan's main state-funded institution of higher education in performing arts.

Background
Azerbaijan State University of Culture and Arts upon its establishment in 1923, operated under the name of Theatrical Institute. The first admitted students were educated in the fields of theatrical performance, acting and filmmaking. In 1954, the Theatrical Institute was named after the famous actor Mirzaagha Aliyev. Since 1959, the school has also trained specialists in Cultural Education and, since 1963, in Applied Decorative Arts.

In 1968, the Theatrical Institute was renamed into Azerbaijan State Institute of Arts. During 1981–1991, a number of new disciplines were introduced into the curriculum, including Painting, Drawing, Sculpture, Art Specialties, Theatre, Cinema, Culturology, and the Industry of Art.

Faculties
 Faculty of Theater arts
 Faculty of Audiovisual arts
 Faculty of Art
 Faculty of Music arts
 Faculty of Culturology

Notable alumni
 Malakkhanim Ayyubova, Azeri folk singer
 Arif Aziz, painter
 Arif Babayev, film director
 Bahram Bagirzade, actor and film director
 Alakbar Huseynov, actor, puppeteer, entertainer, director
 Hasan Mammadov, theater and cinema actor
 Ulduz Rafili-Aliyeva, theatre director
 Nijat Rahimov, Azerbaijan actor

References

 
Educational institutions established in 1923
1923 establishments in the Transcaucasian Socialist Federative Soviet Republic